Stockton is a civil parish in Shropshire, England.  It contains 20 listed buildings that are recorded in the National Heritage List for England.  Of these, four are listed at Grade II*, the middle of the three grades, and the others are at Grade II, the lowest grade.  It includes the villages of Stockton and Norton, and is otherwise mainly rural.  In the parish is Apley Park, a country estate that contains a country house, a model farm, and other listed structures.  Most of the other listed buildings are houses, the earliest of which are timber framed, and the other listed buildings include a church, its churchyard walls and rectory, a barn, a school, and village stocks and a whipping post.


Key

Buildings

References

Citations

Sources

Lists of buildings and structures in Shropshire